The Great O'Malley is a 1937 crime film directed by William Dieterle and starring Pat O'Brien, Sybil Jason, Humphrey Bogart, and Ann Sheridan. The 1925 silent version The Making of O'Malley starred Milton Sills, Dorothy Mackaill and  Helen Rowland.

Plot
James O'Malley (Pat O'Brien) is an overzealous, unforgiving officer who abides by the letter of the law and hands out citations for petty infractions. He pulls over John Phillips (Humphrey Bogart) for a noisy muffler, delaying him long enough to cause him to be late for arriving at his new job that would help him to take care of his wife (Frieda Inescort) and crippled daughter, Barbara (Sybil Jason). After losing the job for being late, Phillips becomes desperate and attempts to pawn his war medals and a revolver. The store owner does not want to pay him what the items are worth, causing Phillips to become enraged, knocking the clerk down, and taking money from the cash register. This leads to Phillips being arrested and sentenced to prison for robbery. Meanwhile, O'Malley is being ridiculed for being too hard on normal working people and gets demoted by Captain Cromwell (Donald Crisp), being reassigned as a school crossing guard at the same school where Phillips' daughter attends. Barbara and O'Malley strike up a friendship, while he falls in love with her teacher, Judy Nolan (Ann Sheridan), whose disdain softens his disciplinarian attitude. After O'Malley finds out that Barbara is the daughter of the man that he sent to jail, he provides for her and her mother, secretly finding the physician to fix Barbara's crippled leg, working out a payment plan to fund it, and helping to get Phillips paroled.  Unaware of O'Malley's help, Phillips, seeking revenge, shoots the officer out of desperation, thinking O'Malley is simply hounding him straight after his parole. O'Malley, further humanized by this experience, decides to exonerate Phillips, claiming that the shooting was accidentally brought on by himself, after tripping down the stairs. O'Malley soon recovers, and is reinstated to his old beat, with the respect of his fellow officers and the loving admiration of Judy.

Cast
 Pat O'Brien as James Aloysius O'Malley
 Sybil Jason as Barbara "Babs" Phillips
 Humphrey Bogart as John Phillips
 Ann Sheridan as Judy Nolan
 Frieda Inescort as Mrs. Phillips
 Donald Crisp as Captain Cromwell
 Henry O'Neill as Defense Attorney
 Craig Reynolds as Motorist
 Hobart Cavanaugh as Pinky Holden
 Gordon Hart as Doctor
 Mary Gordon as Mrs. O'Malley
 Mabel Colcord as Mrs. Flaherty
 Frank Sheridan as Father Patrick
 Lillian Harmer as Miss Taylor
 Delmar Watson as Tubby
 Frank Reicher as Dr. Larson
 Granville Bates as Jake, Bar Proprietor (uncredited)

References

External links
 The Great O'Malley in the Internet Movie Database
 
 
 

1937 films
1937 crime drama films
American crime drama films
American black-and-white films
Fictional portrayals of the New York City Police Department
Films directed by William Dieterle
Warner Bros. films
1930s English-language films
1930s American films